Batrachedra salicipomenella is a moth in the family Batrachedridae. It is found in North America, where it has been recorded from Illinois, Maine and New Hampshire. The larvae have been recorded feeding on Salix.

References

Natural History Museum Lepidoptera generic names catalog

Batrachedridae
Moths described in 1865